Ras Doumeira (Cape Doumeira) is a geographic cape that extends into the Red Sea, towards the Doumeira Islands. The area is shared by Djibouti and Eritrea, and was the subject of a 2008 border dispute between the two countries.

References

Geology of Djibouti
Geology of Eritrea
Peninsulas of Eritrea